Jeltz is a surname. Notable people with the surname include:

Steve Jeltz (born 1957), American baseball player
Prostetnic Vogon Jeltz, character in The Hitchhiker's Guide to the Galaxy
Wyatt F. Jeltz (1907–1975), African American philanthropist and sociologist